Ayame may refer to:

 Ayame (given name)
 Ayame (train), a train service in Japan
 Ayamé, Côte d'Ivoire
 LPG/C Ayame, a gas carrier ship
 Ayame, a Japanese common name for the plant Iris sanguinea

See also 
 Ayane (disambiguation)